GoMo is an online-only mobile telephone flanker brand currently operating in Ireland and Switzerland, owned by Xavier Niel's Iliad SA. GoMo was first launched in Ireland on 15 October 2019, using the Eir mobile network. and has over 250,000 mobile customers, as of October 2020. GoMo subsequently expanded to Switzerland on 16 November 2021, using the Salt mobile network.

Products and services

Ireland
Since its Irish launch, GoMo has offered one product, which is a sim-only mobile contract. The package is post-paid and includes unlimited calls to Irish mobiles and landlines, unlimited texts to Irish mobiles, 120GB 4G and 5G data (with unlimited lower speed data thereafter) and 10GB EU data.

Switzerland
GoMo Switzerland currently offers a sim-only mobile contract offering unlimited local calls, unlimited local SMSes and unlimited domestic 4G data for 9.95 CHF per month, for the first 50,000 customers.

Customer service 
GoMo has no customer service phone lines. All support is via social media and online channels.

References

External links 
 GoMo Ireland
 GoMo Switzerland

Mobile telecommunications networks
Mobile virtual network operators
Irish companies established in 2019
Telecommunications companies of Switzerland